is a Japanese gravure idol, and a female talent.  She is best known for her voluptuous figure. She is from Saitama, and her nickname is 'Nonamin'. She retired from modeling as of 2011.

Bibliography

Photographs 
 Hajimemashite Nonami Desu (はじめましてのなみです / Nice to Meet You, I'm Nonami), 2002 
 Minasama ☆ Konnichiwa (*^o^*) (みなさま☆こんにちは（＊＾○＾＊） / Hello, Everybody (*^o^*)), 2003 
 Naked Peach, 2008 
 Grand Finale, 2010

Magazines 
 FRIDAY DYNAMITE 2011 1/5 Issue, 2010

Filmography

Dramas

Stage Drama(s) 
 Gekidan Taishu Shosetsuka "Muteki-na Otokotachi"(劇団たいしゅう小説家 「無敵な男達」), 2006

TV Dramas 
 Water Boys 2005 Natsu – Role of Michiru Buritani, 2005
 Akihabara@DEEP – Role of Mikiko, the Guest Cast of the episode 9, 2006

Movies 
 Akiba, 2006
 Making of Hyakka Ryoran (大奥 百花繚乱), 2008
 Hyakka Ryoran (百花繚乱), 2009
 Jaws in Japan (ジョーズ・イン・ジャパン), 2009
 Ibutsu Actress "Byoto no Rinjin" (遺物 アクトレス『病棟の隣人』), 2010

Image Videos 
 Pure Smile, 2003
 Cover Girls Nonami Takizawa & Ayano Yamamoto (カバーガールズ 滝沢乃南 & 山本彩乃), 2003
 Nonami Takizawa in the Six Senses (滝沢乃南 in The Six Senses), 2003
 Pure (ピュア), 2004
 Venus (ヴィーナス), 2004
 Se-jo! Nonami Takizawa (Se-女! 滝沢乃南), 2004
 Mitsumete... (見つめて... / Look at Me), 2004
 Majeur, 2005
 Hakutokyo (白桃郷 / Arcadia with White Peaches), 2006
 Anata to... (あなたと… / With you...), 2006
 Nagomi (和～nagomi / The Calmness), 2007
 Toubou (逃亡), 2007
 Rakuen (楽園), 2007
 Dear..., 2007
 My Darling, 2008
 Itazura na Shisen (悪戯な視線 / Mischievous Glance), 2008
 KURA-KURA ~ Nonamin in Hawaii (KURA-KURA~のなみんinハワイ), 2008
 YURA-YURA ~ Nonamin in Japan (YURA-YURA~のなみんinジャパン), 2008
 Suki Dakara... (好きだから・・・), 2009
 Yawa Hada (柔肌), 2009
 Shirahada tenshi (白肌天使 / Fair-skinned Angel), 2010
 Himitsu Yuugi, (ヒミツ遊戯), 2010
 Finale 1, 2010
 Finale 2, 2010

DVD Box Sets
 Takizawa Nonami Special DVD Box (滝沢乃南 Special DVD-BOX), 2008
 Paradise Box, 2010
 WAKU-WAKU Box, 2011

Discography

Singles
 Negau (願), 2005
 Nonamin No Tenshi ~Ai To Seigi No Tame Ni~ (のなみんの天使~愛と正義のために~), 2007
 B-Blue, 2007

Albums 
 Glory Story, 2008
 Peach, 2008

Miscellaneous
 Nonami Takizawa Hug Cushion, 2005
 Nonami Takizawa Calendar 2009, 2008

References

External links 
 Kabushiki Kaisha Macbee – Her talent agency
  – Official Blog with her photographs, from March 2007 to February 2008 (*nttb is the initial of "nonami takizawa trade blog")
 Takizawa Nonami Diary – Nonami's new blog from February 2008 onward.

Japanese actresses
Japanese gravure idols
Japanese women pop singers
1985 births
Living people
Actors from Saitama Prefecture
Musicians from Saitama Prefecture
21st-century Japanese singers
21st-century Japanese women singers